Leonardo Vitor Santiago (born 9 March 1983), commonly known as Leonardo, is a Brazilian former professional footballer who played as a winger or playmaker. Leonardo is a former U-20 Brazilian international.

Career

Nova Safra
Leonardo started at the Nova Safra football school in Rio de Janeiro and was raised in the Jacarezinho neighbourhood, which is also the area where Romário spent his early years. In 1994, at the age of 11 Leonard's football talent was discovered by Jos de Putter who directed the documentary "Solo, de wet van de favela" about him and another young player, Anselmo, from the slums of Rio de Janeiro. The documentary focuses on how football plays a significant role in getting young people out of the hopeless living conditions that many young inhabitants of the slums live every day.

Feyenoord
Following the attention the film brought Leonardo, he moved to Rotterdam to play in Feyenoord's youth academy setup at Varkenoord. Leonardo made his debut for Feyenoord on 19 August 2000 in a 2–0 victory over AZ Alkmaar at the age of 17. Leonardo's debut sparked controversy for himself and Feyenoord as FIFA regulations for the status of players under article 19 dictate "international transfers of players are only permitted if the player is over the age of 18" when it comes to non European Union (EU) players. It turned out Leonardo had been misinformed and misrepresented which resulted in a forged Portuguese passport being handed to Leonardo that made Feyenoord believe they could play Leonardo when he was only 17.

Leonardo had to wait until he turned 18 to play in Feyenoord's first team again. He scored his first goal in the match versus SC Heerenveen, which ended in 2–0. His second goal he scored in the away win against arch rivals Ajax.

In his first two seasons at Feyenoord he played 44 matches and scored four goals. He was part of the Feyenoord squad that won the 2001–02 UEFA Cup, playing as a substitute in the final.

NAC Breda (first stint)
He joined NAC Breda in January 2006 on a 1.5-year deal. He helped NAC Breda to stay in the Eredivisie by scoring 8 goals in 14 matches in the regular season, which made him top goal scorer at the club.

Ajax
In December 2006 Leonardo agreed with Ajax on a new 2.5-year contract. On 21 January 2007, he played his first Ajax Eredivisie game against FC Utrecht Six weeks later in the game against SC Heerenveen he suffered a heavy injury tearing the anterior cruciate ligament in his right knee, which sidelined him for at least six months.

NAC Breda (second stint)
2011 he went from NAC Breda to FC Red Bull Salzburg on loan.

Ferencváros
In February 2013 Leonardo signed a contract with Hungarian top club Ferencváros.

1860 Munich
In July 2014 Leonardo was contracted by German 2. Bundesliga club 1860 Munich. While he regularly played at the start of the 2014–15 season under coach Ricardo Moniz and managed to score twice, he was dropped from the squad after Markus von Ahlen took over the coaching position in September. His contract was terminated on his own wish in the end of November 2014.

Newcastle United Jets
21 August 2015, Leonardo signed for A-League club Newcastle United Jets FC in Australia for the 2015–16 A-League season. 12 September 2015, Leonardo made his debut for the Jets in the 0–0 pre-season draw with the Brisbane Roar at Redland City. Leonardo came on as a second-half substitute with thirty minutes to go in the match for youngster Mitch Cooper in the number ten role. Leonardo made his A-League debut in the opening round match between the Jets and Wellington Phoenix at Westpac Stadium. Leonardo started and played most of the match, being substituted in the 81st minute for striker Labinot Haliti. Newcastle and Leonardo won the match 2–1.

FC Eindhoven
In March 2017 Leonardo joined FC Eindhoven after receiving a Dutch passport.

Career statistics

Honours
Feyenoord
 UEFA Cup 2002

Ajax
 Dutch Cup 2007
 Dutch Super Cup 2007

Red Bull Salzburg
 Austrian Bundesliga 2011–12
 Austrian Cup: 2012

Ferencváros
 Hungarian League Cup: 2012–13

References

External links
Voetbal International profile

1983 births
Living people
Footballers from Rio de Janeiro (city)
Brazilian footballers
Association football forwards
Feyenoord players
NAC Breda players
AFC Ajax players
FC Red Bull Salzburg players
Ferencvárosi TC footballers
TSV 1860 Munich players
FC Eindhoven players
UEFA Cup winning players
Eredivisie players
Eerste Divisie players
Austrian Football Bundesliga players
Nemzeti Bajnokság I players
2. Bundesliga players
A-League Men players
Brazilian expatriate footballers
Expatriate footballers in the Netherlands
Expatriate footballers in Austria
Expatriate footballers in Hungary
Expatriate soccer players in Australia
Brazilian expatriate sportspeople in the Netherlands
Brazilian expatriate sportspeople in Austria
Brazilian expatriate sportspeople in Hungary
Brazilian expatriate sportspeople in Australia